This is a list of people born at Esperanza Base, Antarctica. As of 2010, the following people were named by the Argentine Army as having been born at Esperanza Base.

 Emilio Marcos Palma (1978), the first child born in Antarctica
 Marisa de las Nieves Delgado (1978), the first girl born in Antarctica
 Rubén Eduardo de Carli (1979)
 Francisco Javier Sosa (1979)
 Silvia Analía Arnouil (1980)
 José Manuel Valladares Solís (1980)
 Lucas Daniel Posse (1980)
 María Sol Cosenza (1983)

References 

 
Esperanza Base